MC21-B is an antibiotic isolated from the O-BC30T strain of a marine bacterium, Pseudoalteromonas phenolica. MC21-B is cytotoxic to human leukaemia cells and human normal dermal fibroblasts.

See also
 MC21-A

References

Antibiotics
Biphenyls
Dicarboxylic acids
Benzoic acids
Bromoarenes
Halogen-containing natural products